The Type 285 radar was a British naval anti-aircraft gunnery radar developed during the Second World War. The prototype was tested at sea aboard the escort destroyer  in August 1940.

Notes

Bibliography

External links
 The RN Radar and Communications Museum

World War II British electronics
Naval radars
Royal Navy Radar
World War II radars
Military equipment introduced from 1940 to 1944